Journey to Portugal is a 2011 Portuguese film directed and written by Sergio Tréfaut, based on a true story. It was Tréfaut's first feature-length fiction film and stars Maria de Medeiros, Isabel Ruth, and Makena Diop.

Synopsis
Maria, a Ukrainian doctor, comes to Portugal to spend a year with Greco, her husband who is also a doctor. Upon arrival at Faro airport she is the only person from Kyiv approached by agents of Immigration and Customs that lead her to a room of interrogation, without any explanations. All this occurs because the authorities suspect that something illegal should be behind her trip, since she is from Eastern Europe and her husband is Senegalese.

Awards and nominations
Caminhos do Cinema Português 2011 (Portugal)

Golden Globes 2012 (Portugal)

External links
 Official Official movie website
 

2011 films
Portuguese romantic drama films
2010s Portuguese-language films
Films set in Portugal